Presidential elections were held in Tajikistan on 6 November 1999. They were won by the incumbent, Emomali Rahmonov, who received 98% of the vote. The opposition, who had demanded the elections be postponed, and planned to boycott them (but reversed their decision a few hours before voting began), described the result as illegal. Foreign observers were also critical of the elections, particularly regarding the issues of candidate registration, media access and voting irregularities, including multiple voting.

Turnout was reported to be 99% of the 2,866,578 million registered voters.

Results

References

Presidential elections in Tajikistan
Tajikistan
Presidential